Amica Hallenndorff (born 26 October 1992) is a South African water polo player, who is a member of the South Africa women's national water polo team. She was part of the team in the women's water polo tournament at the 2020 Summer Olympics.

She competed at the 2014 FINA Women's Water Polo World Cup, 2018 FINA Women's Water Polo World Cup, 2019 FINA Women's Water Polo World League.

References

External links
 

Living people
1992 births
South African female water polo players
Olympic water polo players of South Africa
Water polo players at the 2020 Summer Olympics